Jorge Rivera (born December 9, 1973) is a former basketball player from San Juan, Puerto Rico. He played for  Puerto Rico on the BSN for the Santurce Crabbers and was a member of the 2004 Puerto Rican National Basketball Team that competed at the 2004 Athens Olympics.

References

1973 births
Living people
Puerto Rican men's basketball players
Basketball players at the 2003 Pan American Games
Baloncesto Superior Nacional players
Basketball players at the 2004 Summer Olympics
Sportspeople from San Juan, Puerto Rico
Olympic basketball players of Puerto Rico

Pan American Games bronze medalists for Puerto Rico
Pan American Games medalists in basketball
Medalists at the 2003 Pan American Games